Diodella is a genus of flowering plants in the family Rubiaceae. The genus has a wide distribution range and is found from the USA to tropical America and in tropical Africa.

Species
Diodella angustata (Steyerm.) E.L.Cabral & Cabaña Fader - Brazil
Diodella apiculata (Willd. ex Roem. & Schult.) Delprete - Mexico, Central America, South America, the West Indies; naturalized in Angola and Java 
Diodella gardneri (K.Schum.) Bacigalupo & E.L.Cabral - Brazil
Diodella lippioides (Griseb.) Borhidi - Cuba
Diodella mello-barretoi (Standl.) Bacigalupo & E.L.Cabral - Brazil
Diodella radula (Willd. & Hoffmanns. ex Roem. & Schult.) Delprete - Panama, Venezuela, Bolivia, Brazil, Paraguay; naturalized in Galápagos 
Diodella rosmarinifolia (Pohl ex DC.) Bacigalupo & E.L.Cabral ex Delprete & Cortés-Ballén - Colombia, Venezuela, Brazil
Diodella sarmentosa (Sw.) Bacigalupo & Cabral ex Borhidi - Africa  from Senegal to Ethiopia and Tanzania south to Zimbabwe and Mozambique; also Mexico, Central America, the West Indies and South America; naturalized in Java and Malaysia
Diodella scandens (Sw.) Bacigalupo & E.L.Cabral - Haiti, Dominican Republic; naturalized in Africa from Senegal to Somalia
Diodella serrulata (P.Beauv.) Borhidi - western and central Africa; Central America, West Indies, Colombia, Venezuela
Diodella teres (Walter) Small - southern, eastern and Central United States, Mexico, Central America, South America, West Indies

References

External links
Kew World Checklist of Selected Plant Families, Diodella

Rubiaceae genera
Spermacoceae
Taxa named by John Kunkel Small